Alice Matějková Honhová (born 11 January 1969 in Czechoslovakia) is a Spanish discus thrower. She formerly represented her birth country of the Czech Republic. Her personal best throw is 62.66 metres, achieved in June 1997 in Kladno.

She finished seventh at the 1986 World Junior Championships and eighth at the 2002 IAAF World Cup. She competed at the World Championships in 1991, 1993 and 1997 as well as the Olympic Games in 1996, 2000 and 2004 without reaching the final.

Competition record

External links 
 
 
 

Spanish female discus throwers
Czech female discus throwers
Spanish people of Czech descent
Athletes (track and field) at the 1996 Summer Olympics
Olympic athletes of the Czech Republic
Athletes (track and field) at the 2000 Summer Olympics
Athletes (track and field) at the 2004 Summer Olympics
Olympic athletes of Spain
1969 births
Living people
Athletes (track and field) at the 2001 Mediterranean Games
Mediterranean Games competitors for Spain